The 2012–13 season was Aberdeen's 99th season in the top flight of Scottish football and their 101st season overall. Aberdeen competed in the Scottish Premier League, Scottish Cup and Scottish League Cup. They finished 8th in the Premier League, reached the fourth round of the League Cup and the fifth round of the Scottish Cup.
A number of players all departed during the summer's pre-season. Kari Arnason, Rory McArdle, Youl Mawene and Mohamed Chalali all moved on to new clubs as free agents. Darren Mackie, Yoann Folly and Danny Uchechi were also released by the club. Aberdeen also sold youngster Fraser Fyvie to Premier League side Wigan Athletic for a fee in the region of £500,000.

Manager Craig Brown made four additions, bringing in wingers Jonny Hayes and Niall McGinn from rival SPL clubs, as well as adding experienced left-back Gary Naysmith to his squad. Mark Reynolds who returned to his parent club Sheffield Wednesday at the end of last season, was allowed to return to Pittodrie on a season long loan.

Craig Brown retired as manager in 2013, with Derek McInnes taking over for the final five games of the season.

Results and fixtures

Friendly matches

Scottish Premier League

Scottish League Cup

Aberdeen entered the Scottish League Cup in the second round stage, having not qualified for Europe in 2011–12. The draw for the second round took place at Hampden on 9 August and handed the Dons' an away tie against First Division side Greenock Morton

Scottish Cup

Statistics

Appearances and Goals

|}

 As of 18 May 2013

Disciplinary record

 As of 18 May 2013

Goalscorers

 As of 18 May 2013

Clean Sheets
{| class="wikitable" style="font-size: 95%; text-align: center;"
|-
!width=60|Place
!width=60|Position
!width=60|Nationality
!width=60|Number
!width=150|Name
!width=80|SPL
!width=80|Scottish Cup
!width=80|League Cup
!width=80|Total
|-
|1
|GK
|
|1
|Jamie Langfield
|14
|0
|2
|16
|-
|2
|GK
|
|32
|Jason Brown
|1
|0
|0
|1
|-
|colspan="4"|
|TOTALS
|7
|0
|2
|9

Home attendances

{| class="wikitable sortable" style="text-align:center; font-size:90%"
|-
!width=100 | Comp
!width=120 | Date
!width=60 | Score
!width=250 class="unsortable" | Opponent
!width=150 | Attendance
|-
|SPL||11 August 2012 ||bgcolor="#FFFFCC"|0–0 ||Ross County ||14,010
|-
|SPL||26 August 2012 ||bgcolor="#FFFFCC"|0–0 ||Hearts ||11,971
|-
|SPL||1 September 2012 ||bgcolor="#FFFFCC"|0–0 ||St Mirren ||9,288
|-
|SPL||23 September 2012 ||bgcolor="#FFFFCC"|3–3 ||Motherwell ||8,577
|-
|SPL||29 September 2012 ||bgcolor="#CCFFCC"|2–1 ||Hibernian ||8,282
|-
|SPL|| 27 October 2012 ||bgcolor="#CCFFCC"|2–0 ||Dundee ||10,425
|-
|Scottish League Cup|| 30 October 2012 ||bgcolor="#FFCCCC"|2–2  (2–4 pens) ||St Mirren ||7,610
|-
|SPL|| 17 November 2012 ||bgcolor="#FFCCCC"|0–2 ||Celtic ||18,083
|-
|SPL|| 27 November 2012 ||bgcolor="#FFCCCC"|2–3 ||Inverness Caledonian Thistle ||9,193
|-
|Scottish Cup|| 1 December 2012 ||bgcolor="#FFFFCC"|1–1 ||Motherwell ||6,061
|-
|SPL|| 15 December 2012 ||bgcolor="#FFCCCC"|0–2 ||Kilmarnock ||8,790
|-
|SPL|| 22 December 2012 ||bgcolor="#CCFFCC"|2–0 ||St Johnstone ||7,051
|-
|SPL|| 2 January 2013 ||bgcolor="#FFFFCC"|2–2 ||Dundee United ||13,176
|-
|SPL|| 27 January 2013 ||bgcolor="#FFFFCC"|0–0 ||Hibernian ||7,184
|-
|SPL|| 9 February 2013 ||bgcolor="#FFFFCC"|0–0 ||St Mirren ||7,240
|-
|SPL|| 15 February 2013 ||bgcolor="#CCFFCC"|1–0 ||Dundee ||7,841
|-
|SPL|| 26 February 2013 ||bgcolor="#FFCCCC"|0–1 ||Ross County ||6,394
|-
|SPL|| 9 March 2013 ||bgcolor="#FFFFCC"|0–0 ||Motherwell ||8,210
|-
|SPL|| 30 March 2013 ||bgcolor="#CCFFCC"|2–0 ||Hearts ||10,175
|-
|SPL|| 27 April 2013 ||bgcolor="#CCFFCC"|1–0 ||Kilmarnock ||6,334
|-
|SPL|| 18 May 2013 ||bgcolor="#FFFFCC"|1–1 ||Hearts ||10,465
|-
|bgcolor="#C0C0C0"|
|bgcolor="#C0C0C0"|
|bgcolor="#C0C0C0"|
| Total attendance
|196,360
|-
|bgcolor="#C0C0C0"|
|bgcolor="#C0C0C0"|
|bgcolor="#C0C0C0"|
| Total league attendance
|182,689
|-
|bgcolor="#C0C0C0"|
|bgcolor="#C0C0C0"|
|bgcolor="#C0C0C0"|
| Average attendance
|9,350 
|-
|bgcolor="#C0C0C0"|
|bgcolor="#C0C0C0"|
|bgcolor="#C0C0C0"|
| Average league attendance
|9,615

Competition statistics

Overall

Scottish Premier League

League table

Results summary
 As of 18 May 2013

Results by round

Results by opponent

Last updated on 18 May 2013

Source: 2012–13 Scottish Premier League article

Transfers

Players In

Players Out

References

Aberdeen F.C. seasons
Aberdeen